Barbara Połomska (9 January 1934 – 28 July 2021) was a Polish actress. She appeared in more than twenty films since 1955.

Selected filmography

References

External links 

1934 births
2021 deaths
Polish film actresses
Actors from Bydgoszcz